DTM may refer to:

Sport
 Deutsche Tourenwagen Masters, a motor-racing series staged annually in Germany since 2000
 Deutsche Tourenwagen Meisterschaft, a motor-racing championship staged in Germany from 1984 to 1995

Computing
 Deterministic Turing machine, an abstract symbol-manipulating device that was first described in 1936 by Alan Turing
 Digital terrain model, a digital representation of ground-surface topography or terrain
 Driver Test Manager, a test-automation framework provided by Microsoft as a part of Windows Driver Kit (WDK)
 Dual Transfer Mode, supporting simultaneous voice and packet data in a GSM network
 Dynamic synchronous Transfer Mode, a networking technology
 Digital transaction management, a category of cloud services designed to digitally manage document-based transactions
 Data Transfer Manager, a form of autonomous peripheral operations in microcontrollers

Medicine
 Dermatophyte test medium, a specialized agar used to diagnose a fungal infection of the skin

Media
 Dennis the Menace (disambiguation), various meanings relating to original comics as well as TV series, films and video games based on them
 Detroit Techno Militia, a collective of techno DJs and musicians in Michigan
 Desktop music

Weapons
 DTM, variant of the Degtyaryov machine gun for mounting and loading in armoured fighting vehicles.

Other
 Demographic transition model, a model used to represent the changes in birth- and death-rates of a country
 Distinguished Toastmaster, a certification of Toastmasters International
 Dortmund Airport, an international airport in Germany
 DTM, a nightclub and gay bar in Helsinki, Finland